Vishwesh Bhatt is a James Beard Award-winning chef in Oxford, Mississippi

In 1985, Bhatt immigrated with his family from Gujarat, India to the United States at the age of 17, first settling in Austin, Texas. He went to college at the University of Kentucky and then to graduate school at the University of Mississippi. During his time as a student, Bhatt maintained a hobby and side business cooking for friends and colleagues. In Mississippi, he became a regular patron at John Currence's City Grocery, and he eventually joined the kitchen staff. This experience led him to pursue a culinary career, and he enrolled in the North Miami, Florida culinary school of Johnson & Wales University.

After culinary school, Bhatt worked in restaurants in Jackson, Mississippi and Boulder, Colorado before returning to Oxford to work for Currence again in 2001. When Currence opened a new restaurant called Snackbar in 2009, Bhatt was named executive chef. Over time, Bhatt began to incorporate Indian influences into Snackbar's menu, and his cooking gained notoriety. Regional and national publications highlighted Bhatt's signature okra chaat, a combination of southern fried Okra and Indian Chaat masala.

Bhatt was a semifinalist for a James Beard Award in 2011 and then a finalist in 2014. He was a finalist again in 2015, 2016, 2017, and 2018, before winning the title of Best Chef in the South in 2019.

References 

Year of birth missing (living people)
Living people
Indian emigrants to the United States
People from Oxford, Mississippi
Johnson & Wales University alumni
American chefs
James Beard Foundation Award winners